Jackson "Jack" Chileshe Chibwe (born 14 October 1983) is a retired Zambian football midfielder. A versatile forward, Chibwe can play either as a winger or attacking midfielder / second striker. Despite his short stature, Chibwe is known to be a good header of the ball. In 2011, he was convicted of match-fixing after taking bribes to fix the outcome of eleven games.

Career
Chibwe was one of the Zambians who came to RoPS in 2007. He came along with Nchimunya Mweetwa, Chanda Mwaba, Stephen Kunda and Zeddy Saileti's younger brother Derik Saileti for a trial. The quintet consisting of (Mweetwa, Kunda, Chibwe, Mwaba) were awarded contracts with RoPS following a successful trial. Chibwe later extended it to 2012. In the 2007/08 season, Chibwe played 23 games and scored four times in the Finnish second division, Ykkönen, at the end of which RoPS won promotion to the Veikkausliiga (Finnish Premier Division).

Chibwe finished as RoPS's top goalscorer along with Saileti and Titi Essomba in the 2008/09 Veikkausliiga, scoring five goals and providing three assists. He was one of the most important players during the season which saw RoPS finish 10th in the league. In autumn of 2008 he had some injury concerns, but he soon after recovered and played 24 times, scoring two goals and providing two assists in 2009. The following season, Chibwe scored nine goals and provided one assist, before succumbing to a knee injury requiring surgery, effectively ending his season.

Chibwe and eight other RoPS players got sacked in the spring of 2011 due to a match fixing scandal.

References

External links
  at veikkausliiga.com

1983 births
Living people
Zambian footballers
Zambia international footballers
Lusaka Celtic F.C. players
Zanaco F.C. players
Rovaniemen Palloseura players
C.D. Primeiro de Agosto players
Progresso da Lunda Sul players
Association football midfielders
Veikkausliiga players
Ykkönen players
Zambian expatriate footballers
Expatriate footballers in Finland
Zambian expatriate sportspeople in Finland
Expatriate footballers in Angola
Zambian expatriate sportspeople in Angola